Bear Creek is an unincorporated community and census-designated place (CDP) in Pinellas County, Florida, United States. The population was 1,948 at the 2010 census.

Geography
Bear Creek is located at  (27.7560, -82.73712). It is bordered by the cities of South Pasadena to the west, St. Petersburg to the north, and Gulfport to the east. Boca Ciega Bay is to the south.

Demographics

References

Unincorporated communities in Pinellas County, Florida
Census-designated places in Pinellas County, Florida
Census-designated places in Florida
Unincorporated communities in Florida